Colm Barry (born 1993) is an Irish hurler who plays for Cork Premier Championship club Castlelyons and at inter-county level with the Cork senior hurling team. He usually lines out as a full-back.

Honours

Mary Immaculate College
Fitzgibbon Cup (1): 2016

Imokilly
Cork Senior Hurling Championship (3): 2017, 2018, 2019

Cork
All-Ireland Intermediate Hurling Championship (1): 2014
Munster Intermediate Hurling Championship (1): 2014

References

1993 births
Living people
Castlelyons hurlers
Imokilly hurlers
Cork inter-county hurlers